Krikunov is a Russian masculine surname, its feminine counterpart is Krikunova. Notable people with the surname include:

Ilya Krikunov (born 1984), Russian ice hockey player
Vladimir Krikunov (born 1950), Russian ice hockey player

Russian-language surnames